Haddon  may refer to:

Places
Haddon, Victoria, Australia, a township
Haddon, Cambridgeshire, England,  a village and civil parish
Haddon Hill, Somerset, England, a ridge
Haddon, Gauteng, South Africa, a suburb of Johannesburg
Haddon Township, Sullivan County, Indiana, United States
Haddon Township, New Jersey, United States
Haddon Bay, Joinville Island, Antarctica
Haddon, Derbyshire, an ancient settlement, see Haddon Hall

People
Haddon (surname)
Haddon (given name)

See also
East Haddon, Northamptonshire
Nether Haddon, Derbyshire
Over Haddon, Derbyshire
West Haddon, Northamptonshire
Haddon Tunnel, Derbyshire
Haddon Hall (disambiguation)
Haddon Matrix
Hadden